Paul Nettleton is a lawyer and former politician from British Columbia, Canada. He was called to the bar in 1993.

A member of the British Columbia Liberal Party, he was elected from Prince George-Omineca to the Legislative Assembly of British Columbia in 1996 and re-elected in 2001.

On November 13, 2002 he publicly opposed the Campbell government's  introduction of Bill 10 to break up and privatize the BC Hydro electric utility.  He was removed from caucus several days later and sat as an Independent Liberal until the 2005 election. In that election he ran as an independent candidate in Prince George-Mount Robson, but placed third out of five with 2,158 votes. In 2006 Nettleton began to work as a "Poverty Lawyer" for Legal Services of Nunavut. In 2008 he was promoted to Executive Director for Legal Services of Nunavut where he was responsible for the delivery of legal services throughout the Territory. At that time he lived in the capital of Nunavut, Iqaluit. In November 2009, he joined the law firm of Robson O'Connor located in his hometown of Ladysmith BC, on Vancouver Island.  In January 2011, he became a partner in the law firm.

He is married to Elite and has two children, Disa and Thorin.

References

External links
 web page at his law firm

British Columbia Liberal Party MLAs
Living people
Year of birth missing (living people)
Canadian lawyers
Lawyers in British Columbia
21st-century Canadian politicians
People from Ladysmith, British Columbia